Berend "Bertus" Brandsen (28 October 1914 – 23 August 2001) was a Dutch politician of the defunct Communist Party of the Netherlands (CPN) now merged into the GreenLeft (GL). He served as a Member of the House of Representatives from 15 April 1958 until 20 March 1959.

References

External links
Official

  B. (Bertus) Brandsen Parlement & Politiek

1914 births
2001 deaths
Communist Party of the Netherlands politicians
Dutch trade union leaders
Independent politicians in the Netherlands
Members of the House of Representatives (Netherlands)
Members of the Provincial Council of North Holland
Moldmakers
Municipal councillors of Amsterdam
Politicians from Utrecht (city)